John Anthony Panozzo (September 20, 1948 – July 16, 1996) was an American drummer best known for his work with rock band Styx.

Early life and career
Panozzo grew up in the Roseland neighborhood, the south side of Chicago, Illinois, with his fraternal twin brother, Chuck (born 90 minutes apart). At age 7, the twins took musical lessons from their uncle in which John took an interest in drums and percussion. They attended Catholic school and eventually they were part of a three-piece band in which John played drums and Chuck played guitar. They would play weddings at age 12 and were paid $15 apiece.

Then, in 1961, John, Chuck, and their neighbor, Dennis DeYoung, formed a band called The Tradewinds in which John played drums, Chuck played guitar, and Dennis played the accordion and sang. They played local gigs at bars and began gaining popularity as a garage band on the city's South Side. In 1968, Chuck switched to bass and they added guitarists/vocalists James "J.Y." Young and John Curulewski, changing their name to TW4. The band signed to Wooden Nickel Records and changed their name to Styx.

Panozzo was active in Styx from 1972 - 1984, when the band went on hiatus.  In 1993, Panozzo played drums on two tracks for guitarist/vocalist James Young's solo album Out on a Day Pass.

Illness and death
Years of excessive drinking began to take a toll on his liver. In 1996, as Styx was about to embark on its first tour with the classic line-up since 1983, John fell seriously ill and began battling cirrhosis of the liver, eventually dying of gastrointestinal hemorrhaging and cirrhosis in Chicago on July 16, 1996; he was 47 years old.

Tribute
The band dedicated their 1996 Return to Paradise tour to him. Tommy Shaw, who had earlier replaced Curulewski, wrote the song "Dear John" as the band's final tribute to Panozzo.

Gear
Panozzo used Premier drums during the band's early years then switched to Tama drums by late 1978. He also played Zildjian cymbals.

Discography

Studio albums
 1972 Styx
 1973 Styx II
 1973 The Serpent Is Rising
 1974 Man of Miracles
 1975 Equinox
 1976 Crystal Ball
 1977 The Grand Illusion
 1978 Pieces of Eight
 1979 Cornerstone
 1981 Paradise Theater
 1983 Kilroy Was Here
 1990 Edge of the Century
 1993 Out on a Day Pass (James Young solo album)

Compilations
 1995 Styx Greatest Hits
 1996 Styx Greatest Hits Part 2
 2002 20th Century Masters
 2004 Come Sail Away - The Styx Anthology
 2005 The Complete Wooden Nickel Recordings
 2006 Styx Gold (re-release of Come Sail Away - The Styx Anthology)

References

1948 births
1996 deaths
American rock drummers
Musicians from Chicago
Styx (band) members
American twins
American people of Italian descent
Deaths from cirrhosis
Deaths from gastrointestinal hemorrhage
Alcohol-related deaths in Illinois
American rock percussionists
20th-century American drummers
American male drummers
20th-century American male musicians